Karl Von Hess (born Frank George Faketty; May 18, 1919 – August 12, 2009) was an American professional wrestler.

Early life 
Faketty was born in Michigan in 1919 to Hungarian immigrants, and raised in Omaha, Nebraska. Von Hess was a lifeguard and swimming teacher before entering the United States Navy in World War II serving aboard the cruiser  in the Underwater Demolition TEAM 5.

Professional wrestling career 
After being discharged from the Navy, Faketty worked on the carnival circuit for several years, then worked in various regional wrestling promotions.

In 1955, he was inspired by another wrestler, Kurt Von Poppenheim (of the Pacific Northwest) who had a local "heel" gimmick, and there Von Hess further developed the gimmick of the villain into the wrestling persona of a Nazi sympathizer  there being the first to take the gimmick nationwide. In doing this, Von Hess became one of the most hated wrestlers; and fans flocked to the arenas to boo him.  He adopted the name of Karl Von Hess, later changing his name legally.  Von Hess was so convincing as a "heel" that some fans tried to stab him, burn him, and even shoot at him.  Von Hess quickly rose to fame in Vince McMahon Sr's World Wide Wrestling Federation (WWWF), drawing huge crowds wherever he went. In truth, he was reportedly, not a Nazi sympathizer, but used the gimmick to inspire the position of the villainous "heel".

In the early 1960s, Von Hess's gimmick began to wear thin, and he was gradually phased out of the WWWF. He continued to work in various wrestling promotions before quitting the business in the late 1960s.

Later life and death 
After wrestling, Von Hess operated trailer parks, including the Karl-Le trailer park on the Black Horse pike in Egg Harbor Township, New Jersey, and other businesses with his wife Lenore.

Von Hess died on August 12, 2009, of Alzheimer's disease.

Championships and accomplishments 
World Wide Wrestling Association
WWWA World Heavyweight Championship (1 time) 

Cauliflower Alley Club
Other honoree (1994)

References

External links

 

1919 births
2009 deaths
American male professional wrestlers
American people of Hungarian descent
Faux German professional wrestlers
Deaths from Alzheimer's disease
Deaths from dementia in the United States
Professional wrestlers from Michigan
United States Navy personnel of World War II
United States Navy sailors
20th-century professional wrestlers